Fangs of the Wild is a 1928 American silent action film directed by Jerome Storm and starring Nancy Drexel and Sam Nelson.

Cast
 Ranger the Dog as Ranger, a Dog 
 Nancy Drexel as Blossom Williams 
 Sam Nelson as Larry Holbrook 
 Thomas G. Lingham as Pap Willism 
 Syd Crossley as Rufe Anderson

References

Bibliography
 Munden, Kenneth White. The American Film Institute Catalog of Motion Pictures Produced in the United States, Part 1. University of California Press, 1997.

External links
 

1928 films
1920s action adventure films
American silent feature films
American action adventure films
American black-and-white films
Films directed by Jerome Storm
Film Booking Offices of America films
1920s English-language films
1920s American films
Silent action adventure films